Cotton Dell is a nature reserve of the Staffordshire Wildlife Trust.

History
The Cotton estate was owned in the 1700s by the politician Thomas Gilbert; he lived here from 1795, and tended the woodlands. In 1868 the woodlands became the property of Cotton College. The college closed in 1987, and the estate was sold by 1999, Cotton Dell then becoming a nature reserve.

Description
Car parking is at the Staffordshire County Council picnic area at Oakamoor, half a mile from the reserve.

There are paths through the site, which, in the valley terrain, are steep in places. Cotton Brook flows through the valley, and there is a path following the course of the brook.

There is a range of features: the brook, grasslands, ponds, boggy areas and the steep sides of the valley. Particular species of plants can be found in each habitat.

It is an ancient woodland, the area being continuously wooded for over 400 years. The wood has been managed in the past: there are few very old trees, and there are areas of conifers in places, which support less wildlife than broadleaf woodland.

The Trust plans to ensure that the reserve is beneficial for wildlife: managing it so that there is a range of broadleaf trees in the reserve, such as oak, alder and birch, and shrubs such as holly and field maple, and gaps in the wood so that new trees can germinate. Dead wood is also important, providing a habitat for fungi, woodpeckers and other wildlife.

References

External links

 "Cotton Dell Stroll" Oakamoor Parish Council

Nature reserves in Staffordshire
Forests and woodlands of Staffordshire
Ancient woods in England